Kevin McKeown may refer to:

Kevin McKeown (footballer) (born 1967), Scottish footballer
Kevin McKeown (politician) (born 1948), Californian politician